Susan Itticheria (born 1959 in India) is a former Test and One Day International cricketer who represented India. She played seven Test matches and two One Day Internationals.

She is mother of Indian squash player Dipika Pallikal who is married to Indian wicket-keeper Dinesh Karthik.

References

India women One Day International cricketers
India women Test cricketers
South Zone women cricketers
Tamil Nadu women cricketers
Living people
1959 births
Sportswomen from Tamil Nadu
Cricketers from Tamil Nadu